The Netherlands Football League Championship 1927–1928 was contested by 50 teams participating in five divisions. The national champion would be determined by a play-off featuring the winners of the eastern, northern, southern and two western football divisions of the Netherlands. Feijenoord won this year's championship by beating AFC Ajax, NOAD, ZAC and Velocitas 1897.

New entrants
Eerste Klasse East:
Promoted from 2nd Division: AGOVV Apeldoorn
Eerste Klasse North:
Promoted from 2nd Division: MVV Alcides
Eerste Klasse South:
Promoted from 2nd Division: TSV LONGA
Eerste Klasse West-I:
Moving in from West-II: HFC EDO, HBS Craeyenhout, FC Hilversum, VOC and UVV Utrecht
Eerste Klasse West-II:
Moving in from West-I: Blauw-Wit Amsterdam, HVV 't Gooi, HVV Den Haag, Sparta Rotterdam and Stormvogels
Promoted from 2nd Division: ADO Den Haag

Divisions

Eerste Klasse East

Eerste Klasse North

Eerste Klasse South

Eerste Klasse West-I

Eerste Klasse West-II

Championship play-off

References
RSSSF Netherlands Football League Championships 1898-1954
RSSSF Eerste Klasse Oost
RSSSF Eerste Klasse Noord
RSSSF Eerste Klasse Zuid
RSSSF Eerste Klasse West

Netherlands Football League Championship seasons
1927–28 in Dutch football
Neth